The 1990 South Australian Soccer Federation season was the 84th season of soccer in South Australia.

1990 SASF Division One

The 1990 South Australian Division One season was the top level domestic association football competition in South Australia for 1990. It was contested by 12 teams in a 22-round league format, each team playing all of their opponents twice.

League table

1990 SASF Division Two

The 1990 South Australian Division Two season was the second level domestic association football competition in South Australia for 1990. It was contested by 10 teams in a 18-round league format, each team playing all of their opponents twice.

League table

References

1990 in Australian soccer
Football South Australia seasons